William Hopkins (1793–1866) was an English mathematician and geologist.

William Hopkins may also refer to:

William Hopkins (architect) (1820–1901), architect to the Diocese of Worcester, England
William R. Hopkins (1869–1961), city manager of Cleveland, Ohio
William Hopkins (Canadian politician) (1864–1935), hardware merchant and political figure in Saskatchewan, Canada
William Hopkins (Bewdley MP) (died 1647), English politician who won election to the House of Commons in 1647
William B. Hopkins (1922–2012), American politician
William B. Hopkins (Maryland politician) (died 1909), American politician
William Hersey Hopkins (1841–1919), American academic and college administrator
Bill Hopkins (composer) (1943–1981), British composer, pianist and critic
Bill Hopkins (novelist) (1928–2011), British author
William Hopkins (footballer, born 1871) (1871-?), English footballer, played for Derby County and Ardwick
Bill Hopkins (footballer, born 1888) (1888–1938), English footballer
Bill Hopkins (Australian footballer) (born 1936), Australian rules footballer
William J. Hopkins (civil servant) (1910–2004), American civil servant

See also
William E. Hopkin (died 1953), Welsh trade union leader